Carl Gustav refers to two Kings of Sweden:

Charles X Gustav of Sweden (1622–1660), King of Sweden
Carl XVI Gustaf of Sweden (born 1946), King of Sweden

Carl Gustav can also refer to:

People

Politicians and rulers
Charles X Gustav of Sweden (1622–1660), King of Sweden
Carl XVI Gustaf of Sweden (born 1946), King of Sweden
Karl Gustav Abramsson (born 1947), Swedish politician
Carl Gustaf Ekman (1872–1945), Swedish politician
Carl Gustaf Löwenhielm (1790–1858), Swedish diplomat
Carl Gustaf Nordin (1749–1812), Swedish statesman, historian and ecclesiastic
Carl Gustaf Tessin (1695–1770), Swedish politician
Karl Gustaf Westman (1876–1944), Swedish historian and politician

Athletes
Carl Gustaf Lewenhaupt (1884–1935), Swedish horse rider
Karl Gustaf Vinqvist (1883–1967), Swedish gymnast

Artists
Carl Gustaf Hellqvist (1851–1890), Swedish painter
Carl Gustaf Pilo (1711–1793), Swedish painter
Carl Gustav Carus (1789–1869), German physiologist and painter

Entertainers
Carl-Gustaf Lindstedt (1921–1992), Swedish actor
Karl Gustav Ahlefeldt (1910–1985), Danish film actor

Medicine
Carl Gustav Carus (1789–1869), German physiologist and painter
Karl Gustav Himly (1772–1837), German surgeon and optician
Carl Gustav Jung (1875–1961), Swiss founder of analytical psychology

Military leaders
Carl Gustaf Armfeldt (1666–1736), Swedish military commander
Carl Gustaf Emil Mannerheim (1867– 1951), Finnish military commander and statesman
Carl Gustav Fleischer (1883–1942), Norwegian military commander
Carl Gustav Rehnskiöld (1651–1722), Swedish military commander
Carl Gustaf von Nieroth (died 1712), Swedish military commander
Carl Gustaf Wrangel (1613–1676), Swedish military commander
Karl Gustaf Brandberg (1905–1997), Swedish military commander
Karl Gustav von Löwenwolde (died 1735), Russian diplomat and military commander

Science and medicine
Carl Gustaf Mosander (1797–1858), Swedish chemist
Carl-Gustaf Rossby (1898–1957), Swedish-American meteorologist 
Carl Gustaf Thomson (1824–1899), Swedish entomologist
Carl Gustaf von Mannerheim (1797–1854), Finnish entomologist
Carl Gustav Witt (1866–1946), German astronomer

Other persons
Carl Gustaf von Rosen (1909–1977), Swedish aviator
Carl Gustaf Wolff (1800–1868), Finnish shipowner and businessman
Karl Gustav Homeyer (1795–1874), German jurist
Carl Gustav Jacob Jacobi (1804–1851), German mathematician

Weaponry
Carl Gustafs Stads Gevärsfaktori, a Swedish armaments company
Carl Gustaf 20 mm recoilless rifle, an anti-tank weapon
Carl Gustaf 84 mm recoilless rifle, an anti-tank weapon
Carl Gustaf m/45, a submachine gun